Thottathil Bhaskaran Nair Radhakrishnan (born 29 April 1959) is an Indian Judge. He is former Chief Justice of the Calcutta High Court, Telangana High Court, Hyderabad High Court and Chhattisgarh High Court and Judge of Kerala High Court.

Early life and education
Radhakrishnan was born to late N. Bhaskaran Nair and late K. Parukutty Amma who were both practising advocates at Kollam. He completed his education from St. Joseph's Convent and Government Boys High School, Kollam, Arya Central School, Thiruvananthapuram, Trinity Lyceum and F. M. N. College, Kollam, and Kolar Gold Fields Law College, Kolar.

Career
He enrolled as an advocate in December 1983 and started practising in Thiruvananthapuram. Later, Radhakrishnan shifted to the High Court of Kerala at Kochi where he practised in civil, constitutional and administrative matters. He was appointed a Permanent Judge of Kerala High Court on 14 October 2004. He was appointed  Chief Justice of Chhattisgarh High Court on 18 March 2017.
He was transferred as Chief Justice of Hyderabad High Court and took oath on 7 July 2018.
On 1st January 2019 he was appointed first Chief Justice of Telangana High Court.
He was transferred as Chief Justice of Calcutta High Court and took oath on 7 April 2019.

References

1959 births
21st-century Indian judges
Chief Justices of Chhattisgarh High Court
Chief Justices of the Calcutta High Court
Judges of the Kerala High Court
Living people
People from Kollam

Chief Justices of the Telangana High Court